C. N. S. Iyengar (- died 1972) was an Indian professor of mathematics and the founder head of the department of mathematics, Karnatak University, Dharwar. The department was started in the year 1956 under the leadership of Iyengar.

Iyengar received a D.Sc. (c.c) from Calcutta University, Calcutta. After retiring from the Central College of Bangalore University, he joined the Karnataka University, Dharwar in 1956 and retired from there in 1965. He had contributed extensively to the field of  differential geometry and Riemannian geometry. Iyengar wrote a book The History of Ancient Indian Mathematics (1967 - World Press)

References

 

1972 deaths
Kannada people
People from Dharwad
Academic staff of Bangalore University
University of Calcutta alumni
Year of birth missing
Academic staff of Karnatak University
20th-century Indian mathematicians
Scientists from Bangalore